During the 1964–65 English football season, Brentford competed in the Football League Third Division. Despite topping the table between September and October 1964, the worst away record in the division and a change of managers in January 1965 derailed the club's promotion charge.

Season summary 
After a disappointing first season back in the Third Division, Brentford chairman Jack Dunnett allowed manager Malky MacDonald significant funds for new signings. £18,000 was spent on inside forward Jimmy Bloomfield (who returned to Griffin Park after a decade away) and Newport County's journeyman forward Joe Bonson. The team began the season in good form, winning six and drawing one of the first 9 matches to sit atop the Third Division table. The early season goalscoring form of Joe Bonson meant that Billy McAdams, previously a regular scorer for the team, became surplus to requirements and was sold to local rivals Queens Park Rangers for £5,000. While the club established itself in the promotion places, £29,000 was spent on forwards Billy Cobb and Ian Lawther in October and November 1964. As a sign of chairman Dunnett's aim to secure promotion at all costs, a massive £40,000 bid for Torino's Gerry Hitchens was tabled, but was unsuccessful.

Despite a solid home record and regular goals from front players Cobb, Bonson, Lazarus, Lawther and Fielding, a number of away defeats dropped the Bees back into 4th place by January 1965. The FA Cup was exited after a third round replay defeat at the hands of First Division Burnley and a matter of days later, manager Malky MacDonald revealed that he would leave Brentford at the end of the season to return to Kilmarnock. MacDonald intended to see out the remainder of his contract, which expired at the end of the season, but he was immediately placed on gardening leave by chairman Jack Dunnett. Trainer Tommy Cavanagh took over as interim manager. Cavanagh won four and drew two of his first 10 matches, but a 2–0 away defeat to Scunthorpe United on 26 March emphasised the team's poor away record and effectively ended any chances of promotion. Despite the blow, the team reacted positively, winning five and drawing two of the remaining eight matches of the season to secure a 5th-place finish.

Brentford's home record of 18 wins, 4 draws and 1 defeat was the best in the Third Division and promotion may have been attained had the team not lost five consecutive away matches in mid-season. Just one league win away from home equalled the club record. By 19 December 1964, Joe Bonson, Mark Lazarus and Billy Cobb had each reached 10 or more goals for the season, which was the second instance of three Brentford players reaching double-figures before Christmas Day.

The Brentford reserve team had a successful season and won the London Challenge Cup after a 2–1 victory over Chelsea, courtesy of goals from George Summers and Micky Block. In goal was Gerry Cakebread, who had dropped into the reserves for his final season at Griffin Park. Cakebread finished his Brentford career with 374 first team appearances, the most by any goalkeeper for the club.

League table

Results 
 Brentford's goal tally listed first.

Legend

Football League Third Division

FA Cup

Football League Cup 

 Sources: 100 Years Of Brentford, Statto

Playing squad 
 Players' ages are as of the opening day of the 1964–65 season.

 Sources: 100 Years Of Brentford, Timeless Bees

Coaching staff

Malky MacDonald (22 August 1964 – 16 January 1965)

Tommy Cavanagh (17 January – 27 April 1965)

Statistics

Appearances and goals 

 Players listed in italics left the club mid-season.
 Source: 100 Years Of Brentford

Goalscorers 

 Players listed in italics left the club mid-season.
 Source: 100 Years Of Brentford

Management

Summary

Transfers & loans

Awards 
 Evening Standard Player of the Month: Jimmy Bloomfield (October 1964)

References 

Brentford F.C. seasons
Brentford